Zadibal Assembly constituency is one of the 87 constituencies in Jammu and Kashmir Legislative Assembly in India administered union territory of Jammu and Kashmir.

Members

Election results

2014

References

External links

Jammu and Kashmir district portal

Assembly constituencies of Jammu and Kashmir
Srinagar district